The men's 400 metres event at the 2014 World Junior Championships in Athletics was held in Eugene, Oregon, USA, at Hayward Field on 22, 23 and 24 July.

Medalists

Records

Results

Final
24 July
Start time: 19:44  Temperature: 22 °C  Humidity: 46 %

Semifinals
23 July
First 2 in each heat (Q) and the next 2 fastest (q) advance to the Final

Summary

Details
First 2 in each heat (Q) and the next 2 fastest (q) advance to the Final

Semifinal 1
24 July
Start time: 18:43  Temperature: 18 °C  Humidity: 56%

Semifinal 2
24 July
Start time: 18:50  Temperature: 18 °C  Humidity: 56%

Semifinal 3
24 July
Start time: 18:57  Temperature: 18 °C  Humidity: 56%

Heats
22 July
First 3 in each heat (Q) and the next 3 fastest (q) advance to the Semi-Finals

Summary

Details
First 3 in each heat (Q) and the next 3 fastest (q) advance to the Semi-Finals

Heat 1
24 July
Start time: 17:32  Temperature: 26 °C  Humidity: 39%

Heat 2
24 July
Start time: 17:41  Temperature: 26 °C  Humidity: 39%

Heat 3
24 July
Start time: 17:47  Temperature: 26 °C  Humidity: 39%

Heat 4
24 July
Start time: 17:53  Temperature: 26 °C  Humidity: 39%

Note:
IAAF Rule 163.3(a) - Lane infringement

Heat 5
24 July
Start time: 18:05  Temperature: 26 °C  Humidity: 39%

Heat 6
24 July
Start time: 18:11  Temperature: 27 °C  Humidity: 39%

Note:
IAAF Rule 163.3(a) - Lane infringement

Heat 7
24 July
Start time: 18:17  Temperature: 27 °C  Humidity: 39%

Note:
IAAF Rule 163.3(a) - Lane infringement

Participation
According to an unofficial count, 50 athletes from 37 countries participated in the event.

References

External links
 WJC14 400 metres schedule

400 metres
400 metres at the World Athletics U20 Championships